Sun d'Or (also styled as Sund'or) is an Israeli airline brand and former airline with its base at Tel Aviv's Ben Gurion Airport. It is a wholly owned subsidiary of El Al which uses the brand mainly for seasonal scheduled and charter services mostly to European destinations. All of their flights are operated by El Al  as Sun d'Or's own license was suspended in 2011.

History 
Sun d'Or was established on 1 October 1977 as El Al Charter Services Ltd., as a subsidiary of El Al at a time when the airline was fully owned by the State. The airline changed its name in 1981 to Sun d’Or (d’Or means "of Gold" in French), and soon after, Uriel Yashiv, the CEO of the airline at the time, chose to add "International Airlines" to the airline's name to create Sun d'Or International Airlines. This additional qualification is not used in Hebrew, however, and both aircraft flown by the company bear solely the "Sun d'Or - סאן דור" title.

In 1988 Sun d'Or had its head office in the El Al House in Tel Aviv.

Since April 2001, Sun d'Or had grown to become a significant player in the Israeli charter market. The airline also operated flights for incoming tourists, on behalf of European and Israeli operators. In January 2005, Sun d'Or became a private company following the privatisation of El Al. The airline is licensed for the commercial transport of passengers and cargo on charter flights to and from Israel and owned an Air Operator Certificate to operate two leased planes that were fully serviced by El Al's maintenance.

Sun D’Or International Airlines remained a fully owned subsidiary company of El Al and as such its passengers could take advantage of this association. Benefits included the ability for passengers to accumulate El Al frequent flyer points on Sun d'Or flights, and the supplying of food including all types of special meals through Tamam-Catering, an El-Al Subsidiary. El Al also provided ground services, air crews and aircraft for Sun d'Or. The airline had introduced a new look website and were to apply the same to their fleet as well.

In March 2011, The Israel Civil Aviation Authority (CAA) announced the suspension of Sun d'Or's operating license effective 1 April 2011. The CAA based its decision citing non-compliance with Israeli and international airline management standards, mainly lack of self-owned planes and crew. Since then, Sun d'Or no longer operates own aircraft but utilizes planes from its parent, El Al.

In May 2015, El Al confirmed it was in merger talks with its competitor Israir Airlines. While Sun d'Or would be dissolved, El Al would gain shares in Israir instead.

Destinations 

Sun d'Or branded flights are operated by El Al to the following destinations as of February 2019:

Fleet 
As of May 2019, the fleet operated under the Sun d'Or brand consists of the following aircraft:

References

External links 

Official website

1977 establishments in Israel
2011 disestablishments in Israel
Airlines of Israel
Airlines established in 1977
Airlines disestablished in 2011
El Al
Israeli brands